Luxemburger Andy Bausch (born 12 April 1959 in Dudelange, Luxembourg) studied painting and photography. Through interest in rock music he came into contact with cinema.

Filmography as director
 Gwyncilla: Legend of Dark Ages (1986)
 Troublemaker (1988)
  (1989)
  (1991, TV film)
 V comme vengeance (TV episode, 1992)
 Three Shake-A-Leg Steps To Heaven (1993)
 Die Männer vom K3 (2 TV episodes, 1993–1994)
 Fünf Millionen und ein paar Zerquetschte (1994)
 Immer wenn sie Krimis liest (TV series, 1994)
 Doppelter Einsatz (5 TV episodes, 1995)
 Letters Unsent (1996)
 Back in Trouble (1997)
 Balko (3 TV episodes, 1999)
 HeliCops – Einsatz über Berlin (TV episode, 2000)
 Zwei Brüder (TV episode, 2001)
 The Unemployment Club (English title) (2001)
 L'Homme au cigare (2003)
 Dirty Sky (2003)
 La Revanche (2004)
 Visions of Europe (2004) (segment "The Language School")
 Deepfrozen (2006)
 Inthierryview (2008)
 Schockela Knätschgummi a brong Puppelcher (2010)
 Net Cool (2013)

References

External links

Luxembourgian film directors
1959 births
Living people
People from Dudelange
German-language film directors